Ashish Kamania (born 28 March 1990) is a Tanzanian cricketer. He was named in Tanzania's squad for the 2016 ICC World Cricket League Division Five tournament in Jersey, playing in four matches.

References

External links
 

1990 births
Living people
Tanzanian cricketers
Place of birth missing (living people)